Sampson Lennard (died 20 September 1615), of Chevening in Kent, was an English Member of Parliament who represented an unusually large number of different constituencies during the reigns of Elizabeth I and James I.

A prominent member of the Kent and Sussex gentry, Lennard was High Sheriff of Kent in 1590–1. He entered Parliament in 1571 as member for Launceston (Cornwall). He subsequently also represented Bramber (1584–5), St Mawes (1586–7), Christchurch (1589), St Germans (1593), Rye (1597), Liskeard (1601) and Sussex (1614).

Lennard married Margaret Fiennes (1541–1612), daughter of Thomas Fiennes, 9th Baron Dacre, and after her brother's death in 1594 he successfully claimed the barony on her behalf, so that she became the 11th Baroness Dacre. They had seven children, and their younger son, Sir Henry Lennard (1570–1616), succeeded his mother as 12th Baron Dacre.

References

Sources
 J E Neale, The Elizabethan House of Commons (London: Jonathan Cape, 1949)

Year of birth missing
1615 deaths
High Sheriffs of Kent
Members of the pre-1707 English Parliament for constituencies in Cornwall
16th-century births
People from Chevening, Kent
English MPs 1571
English MPs 1584–1585
English MPs 1586–1587
English MPs 1589
English MPs 1593
English MPs 1597–1598
English MPs 1601
English MPs 1614